The NCSIST Chien Hsiang (Taiwanese: kiàm-siông; English "Rising Sword”) is a Taiwanese anti-radiation loitering munition developed by the National Chung-Shan Institute of Science and Technology.

Overview

The Chien Hsiang is two meters wide, and 1.2 meters long. It features anti-radiation payload. While the Chien Hsiang is comparable to the Israeli IAI Harpy, NCSIST has said that any resemblance is purely coincidental and that the platform is entirely indigenous. The Chien Hsiang has a reported loiter time of 100 hours and a top speed of 185 km/h.

History
The Chien Hsiang was first exhibited in 2017 at the Taipei Aerospace & Defense Technology Exhibition. In 2019 the Taiwan Air Force’s Air Defense and Missile Command announced a five year, NT$80b (US$2.54b) project to build up a full force of anti-radiation UAVs.

In 2022, it was reported that Chien Hsiang production was ahead of schedule and initial procurement was expected to be completed by 2024 or 2025.

Launcher
The main Chien Hsiang launch platform is a trailer mounting twelve box launchers. It can also be launched from fixed positions and naval vessels.

Variants

Decoy 
Designed to confuse air defenses systems in conjunction with strike Chien Hsiangs.

Anti-ship 
Two Chien Hsiang derivatives with larger warheads were displayed in 2023.

See also
 NCSIST Fire Cardinal

References

Loitering munition
Military equipment of the Republic of China
Unmanned aerial vehicles of Taiwan
Military equipment introduced in the 2010s